Annibale Vitellozzi (October 26, 1902, in Anghiari – September 16, 1990, in Rome) was an Italian architect, best remembered for his work on the Roma Termini railway station and the Biblioteca Nazionale Centrale di Roma.

References 

1902 births
1990 deaths
Architects from Rome